The Big Chance may refer to:

 The Big Chance (1933 film), a 1933 American crime film directed by Albert Herman
 The Big Chance (1934 film), a 1934 German comedy film directed by Victor Janson
 The Big Chance (1957 German film), a 1957 German romantic comedy film directed by Hans Quest
 The Big Chance (1957 British film), a 1957 British drama film directed by Peter Graham Scott
The name of various episodes of TV series such as The Roy Rogers Show (1955), The Adventures of McGraw (1958), Dragnet (1954) and Window on Main Street (1962)